The Battle of Balanjar was fought around 732 near the Khazar city of Balanjar. The Umayyad army, commanded by the prince Maslamah ibn Abd al-Malik, was victorious and advanced on towards Samandar.

See also
Battle of Balanjar (disambiguation)

References

Bibliography
Kevin Alan Brook. The Jews of Khazaria. 3rd ed. Rowman & Littlefield Publishers, 2018.
Douglas M. Dunlop. The History of the Jewish Khazars, Princeton, N.J.: Princeton University Press, 1954.
Peter B. Golden. Khazar Studies: An Historico-Philological Inquiry into the Origins of the Khazars. Budapest: Akadémiai Kiadó, 1980.

Battles involving the Khazars
Battles involving the Umayyad Caliphate
Balanjar 730s
History of the North Caucasus
730s conflicts